Andreas Eskhult (born 1 April 1977) is a Swedish retired bandy  midfielder.

Career

Club career
Eskhult is a youth product of Sirius and has represented their senior team, Hammarby, Raketa, Zorky, and Wattholma Tensta Bandy.

International career
Eskhult played for the Swedish national bandy team in 2001–2005.

References

External links

Swedish bandy players
Expatriate bandy players in Russia
Living people
1977 births
IK Sirius players
Hammarby IF Bandy players
Dynamo Kazan players
Zorky Krasnogorsk players